Israel–New Zealand relations are the foreign relations between the State of Israel and New Zealand. While Israel has an embassy in Wellington, New Zealand's embassy in Ankara, Turkey is accredited to the Israel. Diplomatic relations between the two countries date back to January 1949. New Zealand has exported a mixture of agricultural and manufactured goods to Israel. In return, Israel has exported a range of manufactured goods to New Zealand.  Bilateral relations between the two countries have been complicated by issues such as the 2004 Israel–New Zealand passport scandal, United Nations Security Council Resolution 2334, and the Israel-Palestine conflict.

Diplomatic representation
Israel has an embassy in Wellington with an honorary consulate in Auckland.

New Zealand's embassy to Turkey in Ankara is accredited to Israel. In addition, New Zealand has an honorary consulate in Tel Aviv.

History of bilateral relations

20th century

New Zealand forces serving with the Australian and New Zealand Army Corps (ANZACs) participated in the Allied Sinai and Palestine campaign of the First World War. In November 1917, these New Zealand soldiers came into contact with Jewish settlers in Rehovot and Rishon. While New Zealand forces maintained cordial relations with the Jewish community, they had tense relations with local Palestinian Arabs, which culminated in the Surafend affair which saw ANZAC forces kill the male inhabitants of Sarafand al-Amar in retaliation for the killing of a New Zealand soldier. These contacts plus the New Zealand Jewish community's interest in Zionism influenced the New Zealand Government's support for the Balfour Declaration's promise of creating a Jewish homeland in Palestine.

New Zealand voted in favour of the 1947 United Nations partition resolution, which led to the creation of the State of Israel, despite heavy pressure from the United Kingdom on all Commonwealth nations to abstain on the resolution. New Zealand gave de facto recognition to the State of Israel at the same time as the United Kingdom on 29 January 1949, and de jure recognition on 28 July 1950. The incumbent Prime Minister Peter Fraser, who also served as Minister of External Affairs, had extensive contacts with the New Zealan Jewish community and local Zionists including the Zionist Federation of New Zealand. He also expressed sympathy for the Jewish people following the Holocaust, supported a Jewish homeland in Palestine, and called for peace between Jews and Arabs.

In January 1973, Prime Minister Norman Kirk approved the establishment of an Israeli Embassy in Wellington following overtures by the Israeli Government. Following Kirk's death in August 1974, his successor Bill Rowling facilitated the opening of the Israeli Embassy in July 1975. To demonstrate New Zealand's policy of "even-handedness" towards Israel and Arab states, Rowling accepted credentials from both the Israeli and Egyptian Embassies on the same day. In addition, New Zealand voted to designate permanent observer status to the Palestinian Liberation Organisation in the United Nations. When the Israeli Charge d'Affairs Yosef Hassin protested, Rowling responded that New Zealand had voted to extend a voice to Israel in 1974 and was now extending the same right to the Palestinians.

21st century
New Zealand Foreign Minister Phil Goff visited Israel in May 2003. New Zealand's Minister for Research, Science and Technology, Pete Hodgson, visited in November–December 2000. A delegation of four senior Israeli Foreign Ministry officials traveled to New Zealand for the inaugural New Zealand-Israel Foreign Ministry Consultations in September 2003. A Knesset delegation visited New Zealand in August 2001.

The Israeli embassy in Wellington closed in October 2002 due to financial reasons, but reopened in 2010 with Shemi Tzur appointed as the Ambassador to New Zealand. In June 2013 he was replaced by Ambassador Yosef Livne.

2004 Passport scandal

On 15 July 2004, New Zealand imposed diplomatic sanctions against Israel, and in July 2005 suspended high-level contacts between the two countries, after two Israeli citizens, Uriel Kelman and Eli Cara, were accused of passport fraud in Auckland. They denied belonging to the Mossad, but received a six-month sentence for trying to enter the country illegally and working with organised criminal gangs. Prime Minister Helen Clark cancelled a planned visit to New Zealand by Israeli President Moshe Katzav, delayed approval for a new Israeli ambassador to New Zealand, and called the case "far more than simple criminal behaviour by two individuals" which "seriously strained our relationship."

Jewish graves in Wellington were vandalised with Swastikas and Nazi slogans carved into and around 16 Jewish graves. David Zwartz, a leader in the Jewish community in New Zealand who was appointed as the Honorary Consul from Israel to New Zealand in 2003, said:"...there is a direct connection between the very strong expressions against Israel and people here feeling they can take it out on Jews. It seems to me Israel-bashing one day, Jew-bashing the next day."

The Israeli Deputy Chief of Staff, Gabi Ashkenazi, was denied permission to visit New Zealand to speak at a private fund-raising event in March 2005 because of the freeze on visits from Israeli officials.

On June 26, 2005 Foreign Minister Shalom sent a letter of apology to the New Zealand government, and said that Israel would take steps to prevent a recurrence of similar incidents.

Diplomatic relations were reinstated on August 30, 2005.  Naftali Tamir presented his credentials to Governor-General Dame Silvia Cartwright before a guard of honour. The Foreign Minister's deputy director for Asia and the Pacific, Amos Nadav, said, "We are happy the crisis is behind us and look ahead to the future."

2015 diplomatic accreditation dispute
In 2015 Israel and New Zealand settled a diplomatic dispute that had arisen when New Zealand assigned an ambassador to Israel who was also slated to be the ambassador to the Palestinians. In September 2014 Israel would not allow Ambassador Jonathan Curr to present his credentials, saying that would violate Israel's "well-known policy" of not receiving diplomats who are also received by the Palestinian Authority. New Zealand ended the conflict by appointing separate diplomats to Israel and the Palestinian authority, a move viewed as motivated by its recent election as a non-permanent member of the United Nations Security Council and increasing impatience within the council over failure to agree on a UN stance in the Israeli-Palestinian peace process.

UNSC Resolution 2334

On 23 December 2016, New Zealand was a co-sponsor on Resolution 2334, which condemned the ongoing building of Israeli settlements in occupied Palestinian territories. New Zealand's Foreign Minister Murray McCully defended his Government's actions as being in line with New Zealand's "established policy on the Palestinian question" and emphasised New Zealand's willingness to "engage constructively with all parties on this issue".

In December 2016 Israeli Prime Minister Benjamin Netanyahu instructed Israel's ambassador in New Zealand to return to Israel for consultations, in response to NZ's support for United Nations Security Council Resolution 2334. Immediately after the vote, Netanyahu ordered a series of diplomatic steps against countries that co-sponsored the resolution and with whom Israel has diplomatic relations. Israel–New Zealand relations had not been so poor since 2004, when New Zealand imprisoned 'Mossad spies' for attempting to fraudulently obtain a New Zealand passport. In February 2017, Israel decided not to return its ambassador to New Zealand and downgraded its diplomatic relations with New Zealand to the level of chargés d'affaires, which is the lowest level of diplomatic relations. In addition, the New Zealand Ambassador (who is based in Ankara, Turkey) was barred from entering Israel.

On June 14, 2017, the NZ Foreign Minister Gerry Brownlee confirmed that full bilateral relations had been restored following discreet high-level contacts between the Israeli and New Zealand governments. These contacts involved a telephone conversation between Prime Minister Netanyahu and his New Zealand counterpart Prime Minister Bill English. English also penned a letter expressing regret at the fallout from UN Resolution 2334. Following the letter and phone conversation, the Israeli Foreign Ministry's director-general Yuval Rotem announced that the Israeli Ambassador Itzhak Gerbeg would be returning to Wellington to assume his duties. The New Zealand Labour Party leader Andrew Little and the Green Party's foreign affairs spokesperson Kennedy Graham criticised the government for backtracking on its previous support for the resolution and sending mixed messages.

Economic relations
In 1994 Israel opened a trade office in Auckland and the New Zealand and Israel Trade Association, known as NZITA, was established. Since 2001, Fonterra, New Zealand's largest dairy company, has been involved in a joint venture with the Israeli cooperative Tnuva. As of 2007, New Zealand agricultural exports to Israel had been hampered by a tariff on foreign agricultural exports imposed by Israel.

By 2008, New Zealand had exported NZ$52 million worth of exports to Israel. New Zealand exports to Israel have included machines, equipment, software, cut diamonds, agricultural products, chemicals, textiles and apparel, military equipment, and food. Imports into New Zealand from Israel were worth NZ$120 million and have included turbo equipment (10%), machine parts (9%); auxiliary plant equipment (8%), electrical products including insulated wire (8%), and diamonds (3%).

Tourism
New Zealand and Israel also have a visitor visa waiver programme. By late 2008, 10,000 Israelis had visited New Zealand.

In April 2011, Israel and New Zealand signed a reciprocal deal that allows tourists to work for three months without an additional visa.  The deal was signed by the Speaker of the Knesset, Reuven Rivlin and his New Zealand counterpart Lockwood Smith, when Rivlin was visiting New Zealand.

Issues and controversies

Israel-Palestine conflict
Like most Western countries New Zealand has not officially recognised Palestine as a sovereign state. New Zealand has condemned the Israeli occupation of the West Bank and has rigorously promoted a United Nations-backed two-state solution. While it regularly votes for pro-Palestinian measures at the UN, New Zealand is yet to formally challenge only Israel when tensions erupt into significant violence, as with the May 2021 hostilities.

Although the New Zealand Government under Jacinda Ardern has advocated a placative diplomatic policy towards both Israel that defends its right to exist, polls show that almost a quarter of New Zealanders believe Israel to be an apartheid state.

2021 Israel-Palestine crisis
In response to the 2021 Israel-Palestine crisis that broke out in May 2021, Foreign Minister Nanaia Mahuta called on Israel to "cease demolitions and evictions" and for "both sides to halt steps which undermine prospects for a two state solution". Mahuta's statements were echoed by Prime Minister Jacinda Ardern, who condemned "indiscriminate rocket fire" from Hamas and 
"what looks to be a response that has gone well beyond self-defence on both sides." She also stated that Israel had the "right to exist" but Palestinians also had a "right to a peaceful home, a secure home." In mid-May, Prime Minister Ardern also sought an assurance from the Ministry of Foreign Affairs and Trade that a shipment of firearms suppressors being sent to an Israeli firm for evaluation purposes was not being used in the current conflict between Israel and Hamas. 

On 19 May, the Green Party MP Golriz Ghahraman sponsored a motion calling for Members of Parliament to recognise the right of Palestinians to self-determination and statehood. This motion failed to pass due to opposition from the centre-right National and ACT parties. The governing Labour Party also declined to support the motion while the Māori Party was the only other parliamentary party to support the Greens' motion. In response to criticism by ACT Party deputy leader Brooke Van Velden, Ghahraman also defended fellow Green MP Ricardo Menéndez March's tweet that said "From the river to the sea, Palestine will be free!." Ghahraman claimed that March was defending the rights of both Arabs and Jews to having equal rights in their homeland.

2011 Christchurch earthquake
A combination of unusual events immediately following the death of Israeli backpacker Ofer Mizrahi in the 2011 Christchurch earthquake caused the New Zealand government to investigate whether he and his companions had links to Israeli intelligence. The story gained media attention in July 2011 due to the suspicious circumstances that Mizrahi held several foreign passports and his companions all left New Zealand within 12 hours of the earthquake and their companion's death. New Zealand security officials suspected Mizrahi and his companions were Mossad agents attempting to infiltrate the state's computer databases to gain sensitive information. An investigation that involved the New Zealand Security Intelligence Service concluded that there was no evidence of such an operation, or their involvement with Israeli intelligence.

See also
 International recognition of Israel

References

Further reading

External links 
 Wellington Jewish Community Website
 Auckland Jewish Community Website
 New Zealand Jewish Community Forum

 
New Zealand
Bilateral relations of New Zealand